Nyiragongo Territory is a territory in North Kivu, Democratic Republic of the Congo.

In November 2022, the town was taken over by M23, with a large number of residents fleeing the fighting. M23 retreated from Kibumba on December 23 as part of the Angolan peace agreement.

It is bordered by Goma to the south, Masisi Territory to the west, Rutshuru Territory to the north, and Rwanda to the east.

References

Territories of North Kivu Province